RSF may refer to:

Entertainment and sports 
 Rainbow Serpent Festival, an arts, music and lifestyle festival in Victoria, Australia
 Referee stopped fight, in boxing
 Right Said Fred, British music band
 Royal straight flush, a hand in poker
 RSF, a French synthesizer manufacturer. See RSF Kobol for an example.
 Russian Ski Federation

Military 
 Republican Security Forces, a fictional fascist militia in the British science fiction series Doctor Who
 Rhodesian Security Forces
 Royal Scots Fusiliers
 Rapid Support Forces (Sudan)

Organizations 
 Religious Society of Friends, the Quakers
 Reporters Sans Frontières; see: Reporters Without Borders
 Republican Sinn Féin, a small political party in Ireland 
 Road Safety Foundation in the UK and Ireland 
 Russell Sage Foundation, a philanthropic foundation and publisher
 Russian Socialist Federation of the Socialist Party of America

Science and technology 

Resource selection function, in ecology

Other uses 
 Rancho Santa Fe, a settlement in California
 Recovery Support Function, a component of the National Disaster Recovery Framework (NDRF)
 Rentable Square Feet, a measure of floor area (building)